Ruahine is a former New Zealand parliamentary electorate, from 1972 to 1978.

Population centres
There were 84 electorates for the 1969 election, and the 1972 electoral redistribution saw three additional general seats created for the North Island, bringing the total number of electorates to 87. Together with increased urbanisation in Christchurch and Nelson, the changes proved very disruptive to existing electorates. In the South Island, three electorates were abolished, and three electorates were newly created. In the North Island, five electorates were abolished, two electorates were recreated, and six electorates were newly created (including Ruahine).

The Ruahine electorate was located north-east of Palmerston North and followed the Ruahine Range. Settlements included in the electorate were Feilding, Cheltenham, Kiwitea, and Kimbolton.

History
He defeated Labour's candidate, T S Mihaere.

The Ruahine electorate was absorbed into the new Rangitikei electorate in 1978. Gandar was defeated in 1978 general election in Rangitikei by Bruce Beetham. Beetham had won the electorate in the Rangitikei by-election, held earlier in the year on 18 February 1978 after the death of Sir Roy Jack. National planned that Gandar would take over the new electorate at the November general election, and stood an interim candidate, local Jim Bull, in the by-election. But, to general surprise, Beetham won the by-election for Social Credit.

Members of Parliament
Key

Election results

1975 election

1972 election

Notes

References

Historical electorates of New Zealand
Politics of the Hawke's Bay Region
1972 establishments in New Zealand
1978 disestablishments in New Zealand